Ifo Island is a low rocky island  southeast of Hélène Island at the western end of the Géologie Archipelago, Antarctica. It was photographed from the air by U.S. Navy Operation Highjump, 1946–47, and was charted and named by the French Antarctic Expedition, 1949–51, under André-Frank Liotard. "Ifo" is an approximate phonetic spelling of "il faut," a much-used expression by the French expedition meaning "one (you) must."

See also
 List of Antarctic and sub-Antarctic islands

References

Islands of Adélie Land